Hannigan is a surname. A spelling variant is Hannegan. Notable people with the surname Hannigan include:

Alyson Hannigan, American actress
Barbara Hannigan, Canadian soprano
Ed Hannigan, American comic book writer and artist
James Hannigan, British composer
Lisa Hannigan, Irish singer and songwriter
Ray Hannigan (1927–2020), Canadian ice hockey player
Robert Hannigan, senior British civil servant and author of a report informally known as the Hannigan Report
Robyn E. Hannigan, American academic in the field of science
Thomas M. Hannigan (1940–2018), American businessman and politician

Fictional characters:
Miss Agatha Hannigan, fictional character in Annie

Hannegan may refer to:

Bryan Hannegan, American scientific administrator
Edward A. Hannegan (1807–1859), American politician from Indiana
Robert E. Hannegan (1903–1949), American politician from Missouri
Hannegan v. Esquire, Inc., 1946 U.S. Supreme Court case

Tom Hannegan (1970–2021), American businessman and politician from Missouri

See also
Hanigan, a surname
Hannegan Peak
Hannegan Caldera